Wolf-Dieter Hauschild (born 6 September 1937 in Greiz), is a German conductor, choirmaster, artistic director, composer, harpsichordist and university lecturer.

After working for the Berliner Rundfunk from 1971, he was principal conductor of the MDR Leipzig Radio Symphony Orchestra and the Rundfunkchor Leipzig from 1978 to 1985. In 1984 he was still awarded the National Prize of the German Democratic Republic, but in 1985 he came to terms with the GDR authorities and moved to the FRG.

In Stuttgart he was appointed General Music Director and helped the Stuttgart Philharmonic Orchestra there to national recognition. In 1991 he went to Essen, where he was also opera director of the Aalto Theater from 1992 to 1997. In the 2000s he returned to the new states of Germany and conducted the Philharmonisches Staatsorchester Halle and the Norddeutsche Philharmonie Rostock. The latter appointed him its honorary conductor in 2004.

Especially with the Berlin and Leipzig radio sound institutions, he brought numerous contemporary works to world premieres. He also recorded the complete choral works of Johannes Brahms. In Essen he could realize the complete Ring by Wagner.

Life

Greiz origin 
Hauschild was born in 1937 as son of the journalist and dramaturge Franz Hauschild (1907-1996) in Greiz. His father was co-founder of the "Greizer Musikwochen" and the "Stavenhagen-Wettbewerb". At the age of five, Hauschild received his first piano lessons, later he took up theatre. Looking back he remembered Käthe Reichel, Reimar Johannes Baur and Dieter Franke with whom he had played in Greiz. From the age of fifteen he composed incidental musics for the theatre of his home town. As a high school student he also received musical composition lessons from Ottmar Gerster in Leipzig.

Studies and professional beginnings in Weimar 
At the age of seventeen he began studying music at the Hochschule für Musik Franz Liszt, Weimar, which he completed in 1959 with three Staatsexamen: Musical composition (Ottmar Gerster), conducting (first with Hermann Abendroth, then Gerhard Pflüger) and piano. For his final thesis he designed a stage version of Mozart's Singspiel Bastien und Bastienne, which was performed at the Staatsoper Unter den Linden. He completed his training in master classes with Hermann Scherchen and Sergiu Celibidache. Until 1956 he was influenced above all by his teacher Hermann Abendroth, whose "overall personality and authority" he greatly appreciated. Furthermore, for Hauschild the conductor and cultural politician Helmut Koch was "an artistic and human father figure.

After his studies Hauschild began his artistic career as répétiteur at the Deutsches Nationaltheater and Staatskapelle Weimar. Also here he composed incidental music for plays. Soon he was allowed to conduct and rehearse contemporary works. After two years he was Kapellmeister. In 1963 in Weimar he brought 's opera Der fröhliche Sünder of his teacher, Ottmar Gerster, for the world premiere.

Station in Frankfurt (Oder) 

From 1963 to 1970 Hauschild was musical director at the Kleist Theater and permanent conductor of the Brandenburgisches Staatsorchester Frankfurt. His repertoire included among others Verdi, Mozart and Bizet. In 1966 he conducted the Kurt Hübenthal's production of Georg Friedrich Handel's opera Serse. He was also responsible for the world premiere of the symphonic work Schwedter Impulse by Nikolai Badinski as well as the GDR premiere of the opera Der zerbrochene Krug by Zbynik Vostrak and The Rake's Progress by Stravinsky. Because of its proximity to Berlin, as Hauschild explained, renowned singers such as Reiner Süß could be won for roles. With the politician Erich Mückenberger, Hauschild at the time advocated a new venue, the future .

Engagement by the Berliner Rundfunk 
In 1971 Hauschild was engaged at the Berliner Rundfunk, where he first conducted the Rundfunkchor Berlin. From 1973 to 1976 he was representative of Heinz Rögner at the Rundfunk-Sinfonieorchester Berlin. On the radio he met Helmut Koch again, a "fateful acquaintance", as he would later remember. So he represented him at the world premiere of Fritz Geißler's Oratorium Schöpfer Mensch. Further premieres at the MaerzMusik in Berlin were to follow, among others in 1975 Jürgen Wilbrandt's Mein Haus hat Erde und Meer (speaker Horst Westphal) and Ruth Zechlin's Klavierkonzert (with Eva Ander), 1976 Wolfgang Strauß' 4. Sinfonie mit Sopran-Solo (with Renate Frank-Reinecke) and Siegfried Matthus' Laudate pacem (with Renate Krahmer, Elisabeth Breul, Annelies Burmeister, Armin Ude and Hermann Christian Polster) and in 1977 Köhler's Der gefesselte Orpheus and Lothar Voigtländer's Canto General (with Brigita Šulcová).

In 1976 Hauschild succeeded Herbert Kegel as leader of the Deutsche Streicherphilharmonie. Even after his move to Leipzig, he cultivated the connection to the capital and was a guest conductor at the Deutsche Staatsoper and the Komische Oper Berlin. Thus he took over the musical direction of the Götz Friedrich's production of Verdi's Il trovatore.

Choral conducting with the RSO and Rundfunkchor Leipzig 
After conducting works by Luciano Berio in Leipzig in late 1977, Hauschild became principal conductor of the MDR Leipzig Radio Symphony Orchestra and in parallel head of the MDR Rundfunkchor Leipzig. He was able to assert himself against the Leipzig general music director Rolf Reuter and the Halle music director Thomas Sanderling, all of whom had been engaged as guest conductors by the legendary predecessor Herbert Kegel. In Leipzig, Hauschild maintained the First Viennese School, thus he continued the "Mozartiana" series begun by Kegel. He also continued to put Concert performances on the programme (Janáček, Wagner among others). On the other hand, he brought with the symphony orchestra and the chamber orchestra various Neue Musik works to world premieres - 1978 Edison Denisov' Konzert für Klavier und Orchester (with Günter Philipp), 1979 Lombardi's Sinfonie, Neubert's Notturno, Lohse's Konzert für Klavier und Orchester (with Gerhard Erber) and Dessau's Vierzehn Stücke aus "Internationale Kriegsfibel" (with Helga Termer, Elisabeth Wilke, Horst Gebhardt and Bernd Elze), 1980 Katzer's Konzert für Klavier und Orchester (with Rolf-Dieter Arens) and Wallmann's Stadien für Orchester und Klavier (with Bettina Otto), 1981 Schenker's „Fanal Spanien 1936“, 1983 Lombardis Zweite Sinfonie and Krätzschmar's Heine-Szenen (with Wolfgang Hellmich). He was also responsible for several DDR premieres among others in 1979 Ives's Holiday Symphony and 1984 Zimmermann's Pax Questuosa and Dittrich's Etym. Like Kegel before him, he always placed contemporary music before Beethoven's 9th Symphony at the end of the season. Moreover, he again invited composer-conductors to Leipzig, such as Milko Kelemen, Ernst Krenek and Witold Lutosławski. With the 1979/80 season he introduced weekly morning concerts in the Kongreßhalle Leipzig. After the opening of the Neue Gewandhaus in Leipzig in 1981, the Rundfunkorchester played regularly in the new concert building. This was followed by an increase in the number of concerts. Hauschild made several recordings with the orchestra, ranging from the music of Telemann and Schumann to Ives, Denissow, Thiele and Krätzschmar, including the complete choral works of Johannes Brahms and several oratorios by Handel. Extensive guest performances took him among others to the Soviet Union with the Orchestra and Japan. After his departure from Leipzig, it took two seasons before the leadership positions could be filled again with Max Pommer (orchestra) and Jörg-Peter Weigle (choir).

In the course of his opera performances in Leipzig, Berlin and Dresden, Hauschild became the "Wagner conductor of the hour" by the mid-1980s, as Robert Schuppert put it. At the turn of the year 1984/85, he conducted the orchestra which performed in the Palast der Republik in Berlin with the participation of the Leipziger Rundfunkklangkörper and the soloists Reiner Goldberg, Magdalena Falewicz, Uta Priew and Hermann Christian Polster Beethoven's 9. Sinfonie, which was broadcast live on the first channel of the Deutscher Fernsehfunk. His conducting was highly praised by John Rockwell in the New York Times. The Dresden musicologist Dieter Härtwig (2007) rated Hauschild "among the leading conductors in the GDR".

Relocation to the BRD and Stuttgart 
After an originally promised double engagement Leipzig-Stuttgart did not come about due to "the rigid attitude of the GDR authorities", as Jörg Clemen explained, Hauschild settled in Stuttgart in spring 1985 on the occasion of a guest performance. There he became Generalmusikdirektor and chief conductor at the beginning of the 1985/86 season of the Stuttgarter Philharmoniker. In a statement, he explained that in the summer of 1984, the city of Stuttgart approached him with the request for a permanent guest conducting position, whereby he would take over some of Hans Zanotelli's tasks. After the GDR authorities agreed to this, he agreed in Stuttgart. In April 1985, however, he realized that the GDR authorities "were no longer fully committed to their promise". He felt that he had a duty to the orchestra members and to the Stuttgart city administration and decided "with a heavy heart" to move to the BRD. In the GDR, on the other hand, he was declared persona non grata and was henceforth also known among fellow musicians as a notorious "" his family only received permission to leave the country two years later. In 1985, Hauschild conducted the premiere in the  Stuttgart Liederhalle, of Kelemen's Phantasmen (with Eckart Schloifer) and in 1987 Yun I-sang's 2. Violin Concerto (with Akiko Tatsumi). Concert tours with the Philharmonic have taken him through Europe, Japan and the USA. According to the cultural journalist Frank Armbruster, he took the orchestra "to a high point in its history. In the end, however, Hauschild left Stuttgart because "he had not succeeded in convincing the city of the need for additional orchestra positions for the Philharmonic," as Armbruster remarked.

In addition to his engagement in Stuttgart, he was guest conductor of the Niedersächsisches Staatsorchester Hannover, with which he premiered Kelemen's Archetypon in 1986. In 1986 he conducted the Staatsorchester Stuttgart bei der Loriot-Inszenierung von Flatows's Martha am Staatstheater Stuttgart. With the NDR Radiophilharmonie oblag ihm 1992 die Uraufführungen von Tal's 6. Sinfonie.

Director at the Aalto-Theater in Essen 
In 1991 Hauschild became conductor of the Saalbau Essen and in 1992 additionally artistic director and general music director of the Aalto-Theater, a dual function created especially for him. In his era the ballets Giselle by Adolphe Adam and Der grüne Tisch by Fritz Cohen as well as the operas Lady Macbeth von Mzensk by Dmitri Shostakovich and Tosca by Puccini were staged. At the Aalto Theatre, however, he devoted himself above all to the works of Richard Wagner, so he had Parsifal (1991/92) and Tristan und Isolde (1992/93) performed here. After seventy years, from 1994 to 1997, together with the director Klaus Dieter Kirst, whom he knew from Dresden, he brought the tetralogy Der Ring des Nibelungen to the stage. Already in GDR times, he had developed a "love for Wagner" through the symphonic works of Bruckner and Mahler, which, however, had to remain "platonic" for a long time, as he explained in an earlier interview. Hauschild also turned his attention to contemporary Eastern European music, premiering Suslin's Farewell in 1993 and Denissow's Concerto for Flute, Clarinet and Orchestra (with Dagmar Becker and Wolfgang Meyer) in 1996. His engagement in Essen ended in 1997.

From 1998 to 2001 he was a freelance He also was active conductor e.g. at the Orchestra della Svizzera Italiana in Lugano.

Chef conductor in Halle (Saale) and Rostock 
From 2001 to 2004 he was the successor of the permanent guest conductor Bernhard Klee and Chef conductor of the Philharmonisches Staatsorchester Halle. In 2003 he premiered Jean-Christophe Marti's H aspiré at the Neues Theater Halle. With reference to the planned orchestra merger, which he rejected, he ended his engagement with the Philharmonic State Orchestra early.

Besides his engagement in Halle he was Generalmusikdirektor of the Volkstheater Rostock and Chefdirigent of the Norddeutsche Philharmonie Rostock from August 2002 until 2004, where he became a permanent guest conductor in 2000. Because, as he later explained, he could not find "an artistic and human consensus" with the artistic director Steffen Piontek, he left the orchestra.

Hauschild has been a guest conductor in Switzerland, Austria, Italy, Spain, Finland, Taiwan and other countries.

Teaching commitments 
After having studied at the Hochschule für Musik "Hanns Eisler" in Berlin and the University of Music and Theatre Leipzig Hauschild initially held teaching posts, and was appointed professor for orchestra conducting at both music academies in 1981. In 1988 he became professor for orchestra conducting at the State University of Music and Performing Arts Stuttgart. Hauschild also taught as professor of conducting from 1989 to 2003 at the Hochschule für Musik Karlsruhe.

In 1983 he founded the "Seminar for Young Opera Conductors" in Altenburg.

Among his students were Michael Gläser, Constantin Trinks and Hendrik Vestmann.

Family 
Hauschild, Protestant, has been married since 1959 and is the father of two children. his son Thomas Hauschild (b. 1964) is professor for horn at the University of Music and Theatre Leipzig.

Awards 
 Culture prizes
 1975: Critics' Prize of the Berliner Zeitung for the directing of Emil Petrovic's's Opera Lysistrata at the Staatsoper Unter den Linden
 1977: Art Prize of the German Democratic Republic
 1984: National Prize of the German Democratic Republic III. Klasse für Kunst und Literatur "for his outstanding achievements as principal conductor of the Rundfunk-Sinfonieorchester Leipzig and the Rundfunkchor Leipzig as well as for his groundbreaking interpretations of works of the classical heritage and for the cultivation of the contemporary music of the GDR in the field of choral symphony"

 Record prizes
 1991: Quarterly list 1/1991 of the Preis der deutschen Schallplattenkritik for the Clarinet Concertos by Wolfgang Amadeus Mozart, Joseph von Eybler and Franz Xaver Süßmayr
 1993: Quarterly List 3/1993 of the German Record Critics' Prize for Sinfonie concertanti by François Devienne
 199?: Choc of Le Monde de la musique for Sämtliche Chorwerke a cappella und mit Instrumentalbegleitung by Johannes Brahms

 Other honours
 1966: 
 2004: Honorary conductor of the Norddeutschen Philharmonie Rostock

Compositions 
Hauschild composed the following incidental music:
 Die Insel Gottes (Manfred Richter)
 Much Ado About Nothing (Shakespeare)
 Faust I (Johann Wolfgang von Goethe)
 Krasnaja šapočka (Evgeny Schwartz)
 Repka (Vladimir Mayakovsky)
 Des Teufels drei goldene Haare (Horst Ulrich Wendler)
 Prinz Friedrich von Homburg (Heinrich von Kleist)
 Antigona a tí druhí (Peter Karvaš)

Discography 
 Harpsichordist
 1974: Joseph Haydn: The Creation) (Eterna) with the Rundfunkchor Berlin, the Rundfunkchor and the Rundfunk-Sinfonieorchester Berlin under Helmut Koch; soloists: Regina Werner, Peter Schreier, Theo Adam
 1975: Georg Friedrich Händel: Music for the Royal Fireworks among others (Eterna) with the Kammerorchester Berlin under Helmut Koch
 1975: Georg Friedrich Händel: Messias (Eterna) with the Rundfunk-Solistenvereinigung, the Rundfunkchor and the Rundfunk-Sinfonie-Orchester Berlin under Helmut Koch; soloists: Regina Werner, Heidi Rieß, Peter Schreier, Theo Adam
 Conductor
 1979: Sergei Prokofiev: Alexander Newski (Eterna) with the Rundfunkchor, the Rundfunk-Solistenvereinigung and the Rundfunk-Sinfonie-Orchester Berlin; soloist: Ingeborg Springer
 1980: Edisson Denissow: Konzert für Klavier und Orchester / Peinture (Nova) with the MDR Leipzig Radio Symphony Orchestra and Berlin; soloist: Günter Philipp
 1980: Johannes Brahms: Fest- und Gedenksprüche / Motetten Op. 29, 74, 110 (Eterna) with the Rundfunkchor Leipzig
 1981: Georg Philipp Telemann: Burlesque de Quixotte / Ouvertüre der Konzertsuite F-Dur (Eterna) with the Rundfunk-Sinfonie-Orchester and the Rundfunk-Kammerorchester Leipzig
 1982: Charles Ives: A Symphony: New England Holidays / Central Park in the Dark (Eterna) with the Rundfunk-Sinfonie-Orchester Leipzig
 1982: Johann Joachim Quantz, Domenico Cimarosa, Carl Stamitz: Flötenkonzerte (Eterna) with the Rundfunk Kammerorchester Leipzig; soloist: Werner Tast
 1983: Johannes Brahms: Lieder und Romanzen (Eterna) with the Rundfunkchor Leipzig
 1983: Joseph Haydn, Johann Nepomuk Hummel, Vincenzo Bellini: Oboenkonzerte (Eterna) with the Rundfunk-Kammerorchester Leipzig; soloist: Burkhard Glaetzner
 1983: Johannes Brahms: Deutsche Volkslieder (Eterna) with the Rundfunkchor Leipzig
 1984: Georg Friedrich Händel: Hercules (Eterna) with the Rundfunkchor and the Rundfunk-Sinfonie-Orchester Leipzig; soloists: Kari Lövaas, Doris Soffel, Hebe Dijkstra, Eberhard Büchner, Hermann Christian Polster, Rolf Tomaszewski
 1984: Georg Friedrich Händel: Israel in Egypt (Eterna) with the Rundfunkchor and the Rundfunk-Sinfonie-Orchester Leipzig; soloists: Carola Nossek, Petra-Ines Strate, Rosemarie Lang, Christian Vogel, Siegfried Lorenz, Gothart Stier
 1984: Johannes Brahms: Geistliche Chorwerke (Eterna) with the Rundfunkchor and the Rundfunk-Sinfonie-Orchester Leipzig; soloists: Julia Schlegel, Heidi Rieß
 1984: Robert Schumann: Das Paradies und die Peri (Eterna) with the Rundfunkchor and the Rundfunk-Sinfonie-Orchester Leipzig; soloists: Magdaléna Hajóssyová, Marga Schiml, Eberhard Büchner, Hermann Christian Polster among others.
 1984: Wilfried Krätzschmar: Explosionen und Cantus among others (Nova) with the Rundfunk-Sinfonie-Orchester Leipzig
 1984: Johannes Brahms: Kanons und Chöre / Volkskinderlieder (Eterna) with the Rundfunkchor Leipzig; soloists: Edith Mathis, Karl Engel
 1985: Carl Maria von Weber: Der Freischütz (Eterna) with the choir of the Staatsoper and the Staatskapelle Dresden
 1985: Friedrich Schenker: Flötensinfonie (Nova) with the Rundfunk-Sinfonie-Orchester Leipzig; soloist: Werner Tast
 1990: Max Reger: Violinkonzert A-Dur (Amati) with the Stuttgarter Philharmoniker; soloist: Edith Peinemann
 1991: Wolfgang Amadeus Mozart, Joseph von Eybler, Franz Xaver: Klarinettenkonzerte (Novalis) with the English Chamber Orchestra; soloist Dieter Klöcker
 1993: François Devienne: Sinfonie Concertanti (Koch-Schwann) with the Consortium Classicum and the NDR Radiophilharmonie
 1995: Siegfried Thiele: Übungen im Verwandeln among others (Wergo) with the Rundfunksinfonie-Orchester Leipzig
 1997: Johannes Brahms: Sämtliche Chorwerke a cappella und mit Instrumentalbegleitung (Orfeo) with the Leipziger Rundfunkchor and instrumental soloists
 1998: Gloria Coates: Symphony No. 2 among others (Classic Produktion Osnabrück) with the Stuttgarter Philharmonikern
 2000: Ferdinand Hérold: Overtures and Symphonies (Dynamic) with the Orchestra della Svizzera Italiana
 2001: François-Joseph Gossec: Symphonie à 17 parties (Naxos) with the Orchestra della Svizzera italiana

Literature 
 Günther Buch: Namen und Daten wichtiger Personen der DDR. 4th revised and extended edition. Dietz, Berlin among others. 1987, .
 Carl Dahlhaus, Hans Heinrich Eggebrecht (ed.): Brockhaus Riemann Musiklexikon. In vier Bänden und einem Ergänzungsband. Supplementary volume: A–Z. 2., revised and extended edition, Schott, Mainz 1995, .
 Vera Grützner: Musiker in Brandenburg vom 16. Jahrhundert bis zur Gegenwart. Jaron, Berlin 2004, .
 Walter Habel (ed.): Wer ist wer? Das deutsche who's who. 43rd edition (2004/05), Schmidt-Römhild, Lübeck 2004, .
 Hella Kaden: Hauschild, Wolf-Dieter. In Gabriele Baumgartner, Dieter Hebig (ed.): Biographisches Handbuch der SBZ, DDR. 1945–1990. Vol. 1: Abendroth–Lyr. Saur, Munich 1996, .
 Steffen Lieberwirth (ed.): Mitteldeutscher Rundfunk. Die Geschichte des Sinfonieorchesters. Written on behalf of the Mitteldeutscher Rundfunk by Jörg Clemen, Kamprad, Altenburg 1999, pp. 132ff.
 Wulf Mämpel: Vorhang auf! 25 Jahre Aalto-Oper. Die Essener Oper ist ein Gesamtkunstwerk und Botschafterin der Musik. Edited by Norbert Beleke, Beleke, Essen 2013, pp. 60ff.
 Wolf-Dieter Hausschild, in Internationales Biographisches Archiv 14/2005 dated 9 April 2005 (hy), in Munzinger-Archiv (start of article freely accessible)
 Alain Pâris: Klassische Musik im 20. Jahrhundert. Instrumentalisten, Sänger, Dirigenten, Orchester, Chöre. 2nd völlig überarbeitete Auflage, Deutscher Taschenbuch Verlag, Munich 1997, .
 Axel Schniederjürgen (Red.): Kürschners Musiker-Handbuch. Solisten, Dirigenten, Komponisten, Hochschullehrer. 5th edition, Saur, Munich 2006, .
 Nicolas Slonimsky, Laura Kuhn, Dennis McIntire: Hauschild, Wolf-Dieter. In Laura Kuhn (eed.): Baker's Biographical Dictionary of Musicians. Vol. 3: Haar–Levi. 9th edition, Schirmer Reference, New York 2001, .

References

External links 
 
 Eintrag zu Wolf-Dieter Hauschild at Kalliope
 
 

1937 births
Living  people
People from Greiz
German conductors (music)
German choral conductors
Opera directors
Academic staff of the Hochschule für Musik Karlsruhe
Academic staff of the University of Music and Theatre Leipzig
Academic staff of the Hochschule für Musik Hanns Eisler Berlin
20th-century classical composers
20th-century German composers
German harpsichordists
Recipients of the National Prize of East Germany